Brisbane Metro is a planned high-frequency bus rapid transit system that will service Brisbane, Australia. It will consist of two routes that will run through the Brisbane central business district (CBD) every three minutes during peak times (20vph), transporting up to 3,000 passengers per hour in each direction.

It will be serviced by 60 electric, bi-articulated buses that can carry 150 passengers, or 170 passengers in 'event' mode. The system will largely use Brisbane's existing busway network infrastructure and stations, but there are a number of smaller infrastructure upgrades being built as part of the project. These include a new short tunnel underneath Adelaide Street in the CBD, an upgrade to the Cultural Centre bus station, the removal of car traffic from Victoria Bridge, and various streetscape upgrades. The expected total cost of the project is $1.7 billion.

Together with Cross River Rail, the project is intended to boost public transport reliability in Brisbane and alleviate congestion.

History
In January 2016, the Brisbane City Council (BCC) announced the Brisbane Metro to address the current constraints and challenges facing the city's current busway network, which had reached capacity at many inner city sections.

Originally planned to be operated by driverless trains, in March 2017 it was revised to operate with high capacity bi-articulated buses reducing the cost by one-third. In November 2017 the BCC released its business case, detailing the benefits, costs and impacts of delivering the project. In November 2017, the project was budgeted to cost $944 million. 

The BCC released a draft design report for the project in April 2018 with a project concept displayed publicly for community feedback, following the announcement that Brisbane Metro has been confirmed as a high priority project on Infrastructure Australia's priority list. In April 2018, the Federal Government agreed to contribute $300 million.

Subjects to approvals, the BCC expects the detailed design and construction of the project to commence in 2019 with services commencing by 2023. This was later revised to 2024. In October 2018 five consortia were shortlisted to bid for the building of stage 1.
Brisbane Move Consortium: Acciona and Arup
Lendlease Consortium: Lendlease and WSP
MetroConnect Consortium: Laing O’Rourke, AECOM and Aurecon
Metro4Bne Consortium: CPB Contractors, Seymour Whyte, Vinci and SMEC
TransForm Bne Consortium: McConnell Dowell, John Holland and GHD

ADCO Constructions began work on a  depot at Rochedale in October 2021. 

In 2022 the project was criticised by a rail lobby group for having a misleading name that implied it was a rail system, but Brisbane City Council rejected the idea of changing its name. By 2023, the cost had increased to an expected $1.7 billion, including the cost of rebuilding Woolloongabba busway station.

In February 2023, construction began on the 213-metre tunnel beneath Adelaide Street in the CBD, which will provide a connection between North Quay and the King George Square busway station. The tunnel would connect the South East Busway with the Inner Northern Busway and reduce the number of buses running on city streets. Construction was expected to take twelve months.

Routes
Brisbane Metro will consist of two lines covering 21 kilometres, linking Brisbane's outer suburbs with the CBD. The network uses the existing busway infrastructure and is planned to provide high-frequency services with three minutes headways during peak times.

Metro 1
Metro 1 will connect Eight Mile Plains with Roma Street, with 11 stations via the South East Busway. The line is designed to provide a new trunk route from the southern suburbs to the inner-city, servicing key destinations and providing interchanges to other TransLink services.

Stations
Below is a list of proposed stations that Metro Line 1 will service and its available transport connections.

Metro 2
Metro 2 will provide a key education, knowledge health corridor by connecting the University of Queensland with the Royal Brisbane & Women's Hospital, Boggo Road transport hub and Princess Alexandra Hospital and the Queensland University of Technology, Kelvin Grove Campus via the Eastern and Northern busways.

Stations
Below is a list of proposed stations that Metro 2 will service and its available transport connections.

Vehicles

The project will introduce 60 bi-articulated buses based on the HESS lighTram 25 with the capacity to carry up to 150 passengers in comfort mode and capable of using the existing busway infrastructure alongside regular bus services. In "event mode" the vehicles were announced as carrying up to 180 passengers, however this was subsequently revised to 170. The Metro buses will be 24 metres long and visually resemble a tram or light rail vehicle.

On 24 November 2019, the BCC announced a consortium of Hess, Volgren and ABB had been awarded a contract for 60 buses. The buses will be fully electric and will charge at the end of each route for six minutes. The buses will be fully low-floor and have next stop displays and audible announcement of the next stop. In addition, they will also have USB charging points and four large double doors. A pilot vehicle will be built and tested in Europe in 2021. Originally planned by 2020, the pilot vehicle is now expected to be ready for local operating testing in Brisbane in 2022, with the remaining 59 to be delivered in 2023.

Depot
A depot will be built adjacent to the South East Busway at Rochedale.

Future routes and extensions
There are proposed future extensions of the network to Carindale, Chermside, Springwood and the Brisbane Airport (subject to approvals).

See also

Busways in Brisbane
Transport in Brisbane

References

External links
Official Website

Bus rapid transit in Australia
Proposed transport infrastructure in Australia
Public transport in Brisbane
Translink (Queensland)